"Ring A Ling" is a 1996 song by Tiggy, which was a number-one hit in Denmark in 1997. The song was written by the "CMN" team, Christian Møller Nielsen, Heidi Lykke Larsen and Henrik Carlsen and produced by Hartmann & Langhoff, who had worked with Aqua and Me & My and other Scandinavian Bubblegum dance groups. Ring A Ling went to No. 1 on the official single sales list after only eight days in store, then went platinum in record time (less than a month) and stayed at No. 1 for 8 weeks. It was translated to Chinese and covered by Taiwanese singer Yuki Hsu in 1998 as "Ai De Ding Dong".

References

1997 songs
Eurodance songs
Number-one singles in Denmark